Theisoa (before 1915: Λάβδα - Lavda) is a mountain village in the municipal unit Andritsaina, Elis, southwestern Greece. In 2011 its population was 89. Theisoa is situated on a mountain slope above the left bank of the river Alfeios, 3 km southeast of Matesi, 3 km northeast of Rovia, 6 km northeast of connected Andritsaina and 8 km northwest of Karytaina. The Greek National Road 76 (Megalopoli - Andritsaina - Krestena) passes through the village.

Population

Notable people 
Ioannis Paraskevopoulos (1900–1984) banker and politician, former Prime Minister of Greece.

External links
 Theisoa GTP Travel Pages

See also

List of settlements in Elis

References

Populated places in Elis